The Musée Grévin Montreal was a waxwork museum in Montreal located in Montreal Eaton Centre in Ville-Marie, Montreal, Quebec, Canada. It was open daily; an admission fee was charged.

History
On April 17, 2013, Musée Grévin's parent company, Compagnie des Alpes, opened the museum's first property outside France, Grévin Montréal, at the Montreal Eaton Centre in Montreal, Canada. Similar in scope to the original Paris location, Grévin Montréal features wax adaptations of people relevant to Canadian and Québécois history and culture.

The next location of Compagnie des Alpes, Musée Grévin Prague is open since 1 May 2014.

The museum was situated in an old cinema complex, which was known as "Famous Players Centre Eaton 6".

On September 16, 2021, the museum announced it was permanently closing, effective immediately.

Attractions
The Musée Grévin contained some 120 characters arranged in scenes from the history of Canada from Jacques Cartier and modern life, movie stars and international figures such as Elizabeth II, Scarlett Johansson, Albert Einstein, Lady Gaga, Mahatma Gandhi, Donald Sutherland, Leonardo DiCaprio or Naomi Campbell.

New wax characters were regularly added to the Museum.

See also
 Musée Grévin
 List of museums in Quebec

Notes

External links

 Montréal official site 
 Musée Grévin official site 

Museums in Montreal
Wax museums
Downtown Montreal
Defunct museums in Canada
Museums established in 2013
Museums disestablished in 2021
2013 establishments in Quebec
2021 disestablishments in Quebec